The 1828 United States presidential election in Indiana took place between October 31 and December 2, 1828, as part of the 1828 United States presidential election. Voters chose five representatives, or electors to the Electoral College, who voted for President and Vice President.

Indiana voted for the Democratic candidate, Andrew Jackson, over the National Republican candidate, John Quincy Adams. Jackson won Indiana by a margin of 13.24%.

Results

See also
 United States presidential elections in Indiana

References

Indiana
1828
1828 Indiana elections